Twelfth Amendment may refer to:

Twelfth Amendment to the United States Constitution
Twelfth Amendment of the Constitution of South Africa
Twelfth Amendment of the Constitution Bill 1992